The National Democratic Alliance (NDSZ) was a short-lived centre-left party in Hungary, founded and led by Zoltán Bíró and Imre Pozsgay, defectors from the Hungarian Democratic Forum (MDF) and the Hungarian Socialist Party (MSZP), respectively.

History
The NDSZ was formed on 17 May 1991 by intellectuals from both left–right political spectrum, including Sándor Sára, Barna Tálas, Sándor Püski, István Kukorelli and András Mezei. By 1993, in addition to Pozsgay, three other Members of Parliament; Kata Beke, a former Political Secretary of State of Education, Péter Szél and Zoltán Varga had joined the party, all of them from the MDF.

The party wanted to retain the spirit of the Hungarian Round Table Talks and the Lakitelek meeting, the benefits of peaceful democratic change. The NDSZ had a third way ideology and advocated a varying synthesis of right-wing economic and left-wing social policies. For instance, the party supported leftist welfare measures (e.g. extension of primary health care and rejection of rapid capitalization), while also spoke out for the rights of ethnic Hungarian minorities in neighboring countries.

Despite its well-known politicians and public figures, the NDSZ have failed to win any seats in the 1994 parliamentary election, receiving only 0.52 percent of the votes. The NDSZ dissolved on 20 January 1996.

Election results

National Assembly

References

Sources

External links
1991: zászlót bont Pozsgay új pártja

Defunct political parties in Hungary
Political parties established in 1991
Political parties disestablished in 1996
1991 establishments in Hungary
1996 disestablishments in Hungary
Centrist parties in Hungary
Neoliberal parties